Nauwigewauk is a rural community in Kings County, New Brunswick, Canada. It is located near the communities of Quispamsis and Lakeside at the mouth of the Hammond River, and borders the town of Hampton. The people of Nauwigewauk are sometimes locally known as Nauwigewaukies.

Name
Nauwigewauk was named in 1858 by the commissioners of the European and North American Railway. The names derives from Nuhwig'ewauk, the Maliseet name for the Hammond River, possibly meaning "slow current."

History
Nauwigewauk was a station on the European and North American Railway and, later, on the Canadian National Railway.  As of 2015, the CNR's single-track Sussex Subdivision still runs through the community to provide rail service connecting the Port of Saint John to the CN main line at Moncton. The town's station is defunct. The community had a post office from c. 1885 until 1969.

In 1898, the town had a population of 150, one post office, one store, and two churches.

Demographics

Notable person
 Anna Ruth Lang, a recipient of the Canadian Cross of Valour.

See also
 List of communities in New Brunswick

References

Communities in Kings County, New Brunswick
Designated places in New Brunswick